Unmarked Van (Subtitled A Tribute to Sarah Vaughan) is an album of material associated with Sarah Vaughan by the American jazz pianist Ran Blake recorded in 1994 and released on the Italian Soul Note label.

Reception
The Allmusic review by Scott Yanow awarded the album 4 stars stating "This is certainly an off-the-wall tribute... This moody and melancholy yet strangely celebratory set will stay in one's memory long after the CD has been played".

Track listing
All compositions by Ran Blake except as indicated
 "Sarah"  3:02 
 "My Reverie" (Larry Clinton) - 3:45 
 "Sometimes I Feel Like a Motherless Child" (Traditional) - 2:57 
 "Tenderly" [Take 1] (Walter Gross, Jack Lawrence) - 3:01 
 "Make Yourself Comfortable" (Bob Merrill) - 2:23 
 "Tenderly" [Take 2] (Gross, Lawrence) - 1:51 
 "Solitary Sunday" - 3:02 
 "My Man's Gone Now" (George Gershwin, Ira Gershwin, DuBose Heyward) - 3:54 
 "Old Devil Moon" (E. Y. Harburg, Burton Lane) - 2:45 
 "A Portrait of Roy Haynes" - 2:34 
 "Whatever Lola Wants" (Richard Adler, Jerry Ross) - 2:27 
 "Wallflower Waltz" (Jack Segal, Marvin Fisher) - 2:19 
 "Tenderly" [Take 3] (Gross, Lawrence) - 3:10 
 "April" [Take 1] (Manny Kellem) - 2:38 
 "April" [Take 2] (Kellem) - 2:36 
 "Call Me" (Tony Hatch) - 2:16 
 "Moonlight on the Ganges" (Chester Wallace, Sherman Myers) - 3:09 
 "The Girl from Ipanema" (Antonio Carlos Jobim, Vinicius de Moraes, Norman Gimbel) - 3:56 
 "Stompin' at the Savoy" (Edgar Sampson) - 3:38 
 "A Little Tear" (Eumir Deodato) - 2:57 
 "Septembre" - 2:53 
 "The Unmarked Van" - 4:20 
 "Tenderly" [Take 4] (Gross, Lawrence) - 3:00 
Recorded at Murec Studio in Milano, Italy on December 14, 15 and 17, 1994

Personnel
Ran Blake – piano
Tiziano Tononi - drums

References

Black Saint/Soul Note albums
Ran Blake albums
1994 albums
Sarah Vaughan tribute albums